The PBA on One Sports (formerly known as the PBA on AKTV, PBA on Sports5 and PBA on ESPN5) is the presentation of Philippine Basketball Association basketball games which started in the 2011-12 season. Telecasts are produced by One Sports (formerly Sports5 and ESPN5), the sports division of TV5 Network Inc., and aired through TV5, One Sports, PBA Rush and simulcasted through livestreaming at Cignal Play and Smart GigaPlay. Also, there is a separate coverage in English commentary on PBA Rush starting July 15, 2016.

TV5, which was formerly known as the Associated Broadcasting Company (ABC), previously handled the coverage of the games from 2004 to 2008.

Presentation

History

2011-2013
From October 2011 to May 2013, the coverage was known as PBA on AKTV. (lit PBA sa AKTV) The games were broadcast on Sports5's AKTV program block on IBC. This was the third time that the PBA aired on IBC. The first was from 1996 to 2002 when Vintage Sports and later Viva Sports handled the television coverage, and the second in 2003, when IBC became one of the two networks (the other being NBN) that covered the PBA.

Games are being broadcast live and a pre-game and post-game show entitled AKTV Center was added.

2013-2014
After TV5 decided not to renew their blocktime agreement with IBC upon its expiration by May 2013 due to high blocktime costs and poor ratings, the broadcast coverage of the 2013 PBA Commissioner's Cup Finals was temporarily transferred to TV5 with simulcasts with AksyonTV, an all-Filipino news and public affairs channel of TV5.

Sports5 proposed to move the coverage of the PBA games to their sister channel AksyonTV starting with the 2013 PBA Governors' Cup. The league however rejected this move since the contract between them and Sports5 states the league should be aired on a VHF channel. Sports5 then offered to air the second game of a doubleheader playdate on their main TV network TV5, one hour after the first game finishes, with the first game to be aired on a delayed basis after the second game (similar on what Vintage Sports did to the coverage of the PBA Games from 1982 to 1986). However, both games will be aired live on AksyonTV. This proposal was denied by the PBA Board of Governors since this violates the terms of their contract with Sports5.

The broadcast of the games returned to IBC for the duration of the 2013 PBA Governors' Cup (up to the semifinal round) as a compromise after the PBA disagreed to Sports5's request to permanently transfer the coverage to TV5 and/or Aksyon TV. The finals series for Governors' Cup were aired live on TV5.

In November 2013, Sports5 and Fox Sports Asia have entered in an agreement to air the Wednesday PBA games for the 2013–14 season live on the cable channel. It will have its own English speaking broadcast panel to properly cater the cable channel's audience.

For the 2013-14 Philippine Cup eliminations, the games were aired on the following schedule:

The schedule for the 2014 PBA Commissioner's Cup has been slightly altered starting March 17, 2014, having the Saturday doubleheader games being aired live on TV5, with a lone game scheduled during Mondays and Wednesdays, to maximize TV5's weekday schedule. As a result, the simulcast at AksyonTV was discontinued. The weekday live airing of the games was returned on starting March 26 after several PBA fans reacted negatively about the delayed airing of the first game. The following schedule was also applied for the 2014 PBA Governors' Cup.

2014–2020
Beginning with the 2014–15 Philippine Cup, all games will be broadcast live on TV5 with simulcasts on AksyonTV and game days (all double headers) will be on Tuesdays, Wednesdays, Fridays and Sundays. Provincial games will be held during Saturdays which is the only single header game day. The coverage is also live-streamed via sports5.ph, where pre-game and post-game analysis are also featured. The radio coverage was also transferred to TV5's FM radio network Radyo5 from the previous DZSR AM network.

The same schedule is also being followed during the 2015–16 season, except that the AksyonTV simulcast was discontinued. When Sports5 got the exclusive airing rights of UFC, they re-activated the previously dormant Hyper HD channel and began simulcasting the PBA games in HD starting in January 2016.

To further utilize the simulcast setup of Sports5, they have assigned a different broadcast panel for TV5 and Hyper/Cignal. TV5 have the Taglish commentary while Hyper/Cignal have English language commentary.

A separate channel was assigned for PBA broadcasts beginning July 15, 2016, named "PBA Rush". The said channel also features game replays and specials.

In October 2016, TV5 President and CEO Chot Reyes told the media that the league renewed its contract with Sports5 for three more seasons.

As Sports5 inked a partnership with global sports media network ESPN on October 12, the broadcast coverage of the PBA games were carried over by the new ESPN5, and the new service was soft-launched on Game 1 of the 2017 PBA Governors' Cup Finals on October 13.

2020–present (One Sports)
The broadcast was rebranded as "PBA on One Sports" on March 8, 2020, to reflect changes within TV5's sports division.

High-definition broadcast
Sports5 had its first high-definition broadcast of the league's games during the finals series of the 2014 PBA Commissioner's Cup. It was aired exclusively to Cignal Digital TV subscribers through a pay per view assigned channel for free. Since then, the HD broadcast has been airing for free on Cignal except during the 2015 Commissioner's and  Governors' Cups, which became pay-per-view exclusive. On January 8, 2016, the HD broadcast has been airing on Hyper HD. The HD broadcast was later transferred to the league's exclusive channel in Cignal named "PBA Rush".

On-demand
One Sports uploads the highlights of all PBA games on the One Sports' YouTube channel. Starting the 2021 season, the games are being livestreamed through the Puso Pilipinas and Smart Sports Facebook pages.

Music
For the duration of the 2011-12 Philippine Cup Eliminations, "Showdown" by The Black Eyed Peas was used as AKTV's main theme music for the PBA games in addition to the generic sports theme used during halftime and interview segments. A different sports theme music was used starting from the semifinal round of the Philippine Cup. This was still used up to the finals of the 2012 Governors Cup.

For the 2012–13 PBA season, a theme music entitled "Kampihan na!" was used on their on-air presentation. During the Philippine Cup, AKTV used a version of this theme without vocals. The vocals were later added during the elimination round of the Commissioner's Cup and was used until the  Governors' Cup. A different theme was introduced during the quarterfinal and semifinal rounds of the Commissioner's Cup entitled "Tuloy ang Laban", which was also used sporadically during the Governors' Cup.

A remixed version of the "Kampihan na!" theme was used for the 2013–14 season. The remixed theme was used during the Philippine Cup, however a different background music was used for the Commissioner's and Governors' Cups.

During the 2014–15 season, "Ito ang Liga" which was composed by Jungee Marcelo and Thyro Alfaro and interpreted by Ebe Dancel, Sam Concepcion and rapper Gloc-9 is used as the main theme of the league's 40th season. An instrumental version, as well as a different rendition of the song, is used as bed (background music) and on the opening billboard during the coverage.

A new theme entitled "Liga ng mga Bida" performed by Abra and Aya of Project Pilipinas, was introduced for the 2015–16 season. It is used as the background and OBB music of the coverage. Generic background music was also used for the 2016 Commissioner's and Governors' Cup and also used during the 2016–17 Philippine Cup.

For the 2017 Commissioner's Cup, a new theme was introduced entitled "We Are PBA" performed by Quest. It was used as the background music of both TV and radio coverage until the 2017-18 PBA Philippine Cup.

"Ito ang Liga" was reinstated for the 2017-18 PBA Philippine Cup Finals, albeit with a marching band rendition and addition of the battlecry "Laro Mo 'To!" (Tagalog for This Is Your Game!).

In the 2019 PBA Season, the theme song was based on the previous theme song (Finals) but instead of "Laro Mo 'To!" battlecry, the Tagalog battlecry "Laban kung laban!" was added. Shantidope was featured in the song, rapping after the Ito ang Liga chorus. (This battlecry is Tagalog for Fight in the Fight.)

For the 2020 season, the "Ito Ang Liga" theme song remixed once again to reflect the season's theme "Tayo Ang Bida" which it was sung by Sam Concepcion and Gloc-9. This theme was also re-used for 2021 season with no major remixes or re-recordings.

For the 2022 season, the "Ito Ang Liga" theme song was once again remixed for the 4th time to reflect the season's theme "Game Tayo Dito!" battlecry. Beginning October 17, 2022 amidst the middle of the 2022-2023 PBA Commissioner's Cup conference this season, new official theme song was introduced, it is entitled as "Level Up" performed by Thyro Alfaro (who also performed the "Game Tayo Dito!" song on the previous conference). Although, the "Game Tayo Dito!" song was still being used as secondary theme song and for in-venue music purposes.

Broadcast history
AKTV on IBC (October 2, 2011 – May 12, 2013)
Sports5 on IBC (August 14, 2013 – October 7, 2013)
Sports5 on TV5 (May 15–19, October 11, 2013 – October 8, 2017)
ESPN5 (October 13, 2017  – January 17, 2020)
One Sports (March 8, 2020 – present)

Pre/post game segments

List of broadcasters

TV panel

Play by Play
Aaron Atayde (PBA Rush: 2011–2017)
Charlie Cuna (2012–present)
Paolo del Rosario (PBA Rush: 2018–present)
Magoo Marjon (2011–present)
Carlo Pamintuan (PBA Rush: 2015–present)
Chiqui Reyes (2011–12, 2014, 2016–present)
Sev Sarmenta (2011, 2015–present)
James Velasquez (2012–present)

Analyst
Jolly Escobar (2012–2017, 2021–present)
Ryan Gregorio (2011–13, 2014–present)
Vince Hizon (game analyst: 2016–2017, 2022–present)
Quinito Henson (2011–present)
Andy Jao (2014–present)
Ali Peek (PBA Rush: 2014–present)
Eric Reyes (2012–present)
Charles Tiu (PBA Rush: 2015–present)
Jong Uichico (PBA Rush: 2016–present)
Dominic Uy (2011–present)

Courtside Reporter
Selina Dagdag-Alas (2016–present)
Apple David (2014–present)
Carla Lizardo (2014–present)
Denise Tan (2016–present)

Previous

Don Allado (game analyst (PBA Rush): 2016–2019)
Chuck Araneta (PBA Rush: 2017–22)
Ramon Bautista (Sports5 Center segment host, 2013–14)
Patricia Bermudez-Hizon (AKTV Center host, 2011–12)
Lia Cruz (Home Court segment, 2012)
Mara Aquino (MoneyBall host, sideline reporter: 2014–2018)
Richard del Rosario (AKTV Center host, 2011–13)*
Mich Del Carmen (sideline reporter: 2017)
Ai dela Cruz (sideline reporter: 2014–2015)
Tony dela Cruz (game analyst (PBA Rush), 2017–2019)
Rizza Diaz (halftime show host, sideline reporter: 2013–2019)
Rado Dimalibot (play-by-play, game analyst: 2012–2014, 2015)
Kenneth Duremdes (game analyst, 2012–13)
Amanda Fernandez (game analyst, play-by-play, sideline reporter (PBA Rush): 2018–2019)
Jayvee Gayoso (game analyst: 2016–2017)
Sel Guevara (sideline reporter: 2011–2013, 2014–2018)
Mico Halili (play-by-play: 2011–2015)
Vince Hizon (game analyst: 2016–2017)
Jojo Lastimosa (game analyst, Sports5 Center analyst: 2011–12, 2014)
Frankie Lim (game analyst, 2011–2014)
Miakka Lim (sideline reporter, 2012)
Cesca Litton-Kalaw (sideline reporter: 2018–present)
Chino Lui Pio (Sports5 Center host: 2016–2018)
Ronnie Magsanoc (game analyst, 2011–2015)*
Jessica Mendoza (sideline reporter, 2011–13)
Eric Menk (game analyst: 2017)
L.A. Mumar (sideline reporter, 2011–12)
Erika Padilla (Sports5 Center host, sideline reporter: 2011–2017)
Trish Roque (Sports5 Center host, sideline reporter: 2016–2017)
Benjie Paras (game analyst, AKTV/Sports5 Center analyst, 2012–2014)
Barry Pascua† (game analyst, 2011)
Nikko Ramos (play-by-play, sideline reporter, Sports5 Center host, MoneyBall host: 2012–2014)
Jinno Rufino (sideline reporter (PBA Rush): 2019)
Judy Saril (MoneyBall host: 2014, sideline reporter)
Angelika Schmeing-Cruz (sideline reporter, 2011)
Jutt Sulit (sideline reporter, play-by-play: 2014–2015, 2016–2017)
Anthony Suntay (play-by-play: 2015–2018)
Luigi Trillo (game analyst: 2014)
Jason Webb (game analyst: 2011–2014)
Sam YG (Sports5 Center segment host, 2013–14)
Noel Zarate (play-by-play: 2014–2017)

Fox Sports panel
Jude Turcuato (play-by-play, 2013–2015) (Also worked as VP for Territory Head of Fox International Channels Philippines)
Patricia Bermudez-Hizon (play-by-play, 2013–2015)
Vince Hizon (game analyst, 2013–2015)
Charles Tiu (game analyst, 2013–2015)
Ronnie Magsanoc (game analyst: 2014–2015)
Shawn Weinstein (play-by-play, 2014–2015)
Kirk Long (game analyst, 2014–2015)
Nicholas Nathanielsz (play-by-play, 2015)
Aaron Atayde (play-by-play: 2013–2014)
Mico Halili (lead play-by-play: 2013–2015)
Jason Webb (game analyst, 2013–2014)
Alex Compton (game analyst, 2013–2014)
Chiqui Reyes (play-by-play, 2013–2014)
James Velasquez (play-by-play, 2013–2014)
Nikko Ramos (play-by-play, 2014–2015)
Andrei Felix (play-by-play, 2015)

Radio coverage panel
Chuck Araneta (play-by-play, studio host)
Koy Banal (game analyst)
Apple David (studio host)
Mich Del Carmen (studio host)
Rizza Diaz (studio host)
Jolly Escobar (play-by-play, game analyst)
Wesley Gonzales (game analyst)
Carla Lizardo (studio host)
Ali Peek (game analyst)
Cesca Litton-Kalaw (studio host)
Chiqui Reyes (play-by-play, game analyst)
Benjie Santiago (play-by-play)
Renren Ritualo (game analyst)
Boybits Victoria (game analyst)
James Velasquez (play by play, studio host)
Jinno Rufino (studio host)

Previous
Mara Aquino (studio host)
Denise Tan (studio host)
Noel Zarate (play by play)
Barry Pascua† (game analyst)
Joanne Ignacio (play-by-play, studio host)

* - denotes that the broadcaster can only host if their affiliated PBA team had no game for that coverage day.

See also
PBA on Vintage Sports
PBA on Viva TV
PBA on NBN/IBC
PBA on ABC
Philippine Basketball Association
PBA Rush
ESPN5
One Sports
List of programs previously broadcast by Intercontinental Broadcasting Corporation
List of programs aired by TV5 (Philippine TV network)
List of programs aired by AksyonTV/5 Plus

References

External links
 
 
 

Sports5
2020s Philippine television series
2011 Philippine television series debuts
Intercontinental Broadcasting Corporation original programming
AksyonTV original programming
TV5 (Philippine TV network) original programming
Philippine sports television series
Television productions suspended due to the COVID-19 pandemic